Events in the year 1196 in Japan.

Incumbents
Monarch: Go-Toba

Births
January 3 - Emperor Tsuchimikado (d. 1231)

References

 
 
Japan
Years of the 12th century in Japan